The Centre for Combating Extremism, also known as Centre E is a unit within the Ministry of Internal Affairs of the Russian Federation.

The unit was established by decree No. 1316 of the President of the Russian Federation on 16 September 2008. The unit has been especially active in the North Caucasus and also in Crimea following its annexation in 2014. Their official focus is the suppression of extremism. The Centre E has been widely accused of prosecuting and harassing opposition groups, anti-regime bloggers, environmentalists and other civic activists. One example of their work is the suppression of the Jehovah's Witnesses in Russia.

References

Law enforcement agencies of Russia